Johan Henrik Dahl (15 August 1928 – 2 July 2011) was a Norwegian diplomat.

He held an MBA degree and started working for the Norwegian Ministry of Foreign Affairs in 1953. He was posted in Bremen, Cape Town, Bern, London and Geneva. In 1975 he was appointed as an assistant secretary in the Ministry of Foreign Affairs. After a stint from 1978 as embassy counsellor in Washington, DC he became the Ministry's special adviser on petroleum and energy affairs in 1983. In that respect he was also Norway's ambassador to the International Energy Agency.

Dahl rounded off his career as the Norwegian ambassador to Thailand (also covering Vietnam, Laos and Cambodia) from 1989 to 1993 and ambassador to Zimbabwe (also covering Botswana, Mozambique and Angola) from 1993 to 1997. He was decorated as a Commander of the Order of St. Olav. He settled in Holmestrand and died shortly before his 83rd birthday.

References

1928 births
2011 deaths
Norwegian civil servants
Norwegian expatriates in Germany
Norwegian expatriates in South Africa
Norwegian expatriates in Switzerland
Norwegian expatriates in the United Kingdom
Norwegian expatriates in the United States
Ambassadors of Norway to Thailand
Ambassadors of Norway to Vietnam
Ambassadors of Norway to Laos
Ambassadors of Norway to Cambodia
Ambassadors of Norway to Zimbabwe
Ambassadors of Norway to Botswana
Ambassadors of Norway to Mozambique
Ambassadors of Norway to Angola
People from Holmestrand